The 1958-59 French Rugby Union Championship was contested by 48 clubs divided in six pools of eight.

The five better of each pool and the two better 6th (for a sum of 32 clubs) were qualified to play a play-off phase.

The championship was won by Racing Paris that defeated Mont-de-Marsan in the final.

Context 
The 1959 Five Nations Championship was won France .

The Challenge Yves du Manoir was won by Dax that beat Pau for 12-8.

Qualification round 

In bold the qualified to "last 32" phase

"Last 32" 

In bold the clubs qualified for the next round

"Last 16" 

In bold the clubs qualified for the next round

Quarter of finals 

In bold the clubs qualified for the next round

Semifinals

Final 

François Moncla, Michel Crauste and Arnaud Marquesuzaa

External links
 Compte rendu finale de 1959 lnr.fr

1959
France 1959
Championship